Jack Vance (born December 15, 1997) is an American tennis player.

Vance has a career high ATP doubles ranking of 588 achieved on August 1, 2022.

Vance made his ATP main draw debut at the 2022 Delray Beach Open after entering the doubles main draw as alternates with his twin brother Jamie.

References

External links

1997 births
Living people
American male tennis players
Sportspeople from Denver
Tennis people from Colorado